Scorched-Earth Policy is a thrash metal band from Oakland, California. It was formed in 1997 by current members Mark Lamb, and Lance Lea.

Members of this act have included long established musicians in the San Francisco Bay Area music scene. Current and former members of Scorched-Earth Policy have been in such notable acts as Acid King, Forbidden (band), Testament, WarDance, Earth Crawler, and Manmade God.

Every release since the Bootcamp demo has been engineered by Thilo Fehlinger, who has worked with Death Angel, and Exodus (band) to name a few.

Discography

Awards/Recognition

September 2000 – Voted by Germany's Rock Hard magazine as one of 20 best unsigned bands.

July 2008 – The song “Dropping Names” used on the soundtrack to 199 Lives: The Travis Pastrana Story.

February 2010 – One of 20 finalists in the Scion AV/Metalinsider.net “No Label Needed” Contest.

January 2011 – "Millennial Delusions" named one of the most anticipated releases of the year by Metalsucks.net.

External links
Official Scorched-Earth Policy website (password required to access)
Metalsucks.net discusses "Millennial Delusions"
Metalsucks.net endorses Scorched-Earth Policy in the Scion “No Label Needed” contest
Metalinsider.net interview
Metalinsider.net streams "Millennial Delusions"
Profile page on Metal-Archives.com
"MMVI" review at Themetalforge.com

Thrash metal musical groups from California
Musical groups established in 1997
Musical groups from Oakland, California